Solingen is a city in North Rhine-Westphalia, Germany. It is located some 25 km east of Düsseldorf along the northern edge of the region called Bergisches Land, south of the Ruhr area, and, with a 2009 population of 161,366, is after Wuppertal the second-largest city in the Bergisches Land. It is a member of the regional authority of the Rhineland.

Solingen is called the "City of Blades", since it has long been renowned for the manufacturing of fine swords, knives, scissors and razors made by famous firms such as WKC, DOVO, Wüsthof, Zwilling J. A. Henckels, Böker, Güde, Hubertus, Diefenthal, Puma, Clauberg, Eickhorn, Linder, Carl Schmidt Sohn, Dreiturm, Herder, Martor Safety Knives, and numerous other manufacturers.

In medieval times, the swordsmiths of Solingen designed the town's coat of arms, which continues to the present. In the latter part of the 17th century, a group of swordsmiths from Solingen broke their guild oaths by taking their sword-making secrets with them to Shotley Bridge, County Durham in England.

Geography

Solingen lies southwest of Wuppertal in the Bergisches Land. The city's highest point at 276 metres (906 ft) is in the northern borough of Gräfrath at the Light Tower, previously the water tower, and the lowest point at 53 metres (174 ft) is in the southwest.

Neighbouring cities and communities
The following cities and communities share a border with Solingen, starting in the northeast and going clockwise around the city:
Wuppertal (unitary urban district)
Remscheid (unitary urban district)
Wermelskirchen (within the Rheinisch-Bergischer district)
Leichlingen (Rheinisch-Bergischer district)
Langenfeld (within the district of Mettmann)
Hilden (Mettmann)
Haan (Mettmann)

City administration
Solingen currently consists of five boroughs. Each borough has a municipal council of either 13 or 15 representatives (Bezirksvertreter) elected every five years by the borough's population. The municipal councils are responsible for many of the boroughs' important administrative affairs.

The five city boroughs:
Gräfrath
Wald (Solingen)
(Solingen-)Mitte
Ohligs/Aufderhöhe/Merscheid
Höhscheid/Burg

The individuals boroughs are in part composed of separate quarters or residential areas with their own names, although they often lack precise borders. These areas are:

 Aufderhöhe: Aufderbech, Börkhaus, Gosse, Horn, Holzhof, Josefstal, Landwehr, Löhdorf, Pohligsfeld, Riefnacken, Rupelrath, Siebels, Steinendorf, Ufer, Wiefeldick
 Burg: Angerscheid, Höhrath
 Gräfrath: Central, Flachsberg, Flockertsholz, Focher Dahl, Fürkeltrath, Heide, Ketzberg, Külf, Nümmen, Piepersberg, Rathland, Schieten, Zum Holz
 Höhscheid: Balkhausen, Bünkenberg, Dorperhof, Friedrichstal, Fürkelt, Glüder, Grünewald, Haasenmühle, Hästen, Katternberg, Kohlsberg, Meiswinkel, Nacken, Pfaffenberg, Pilghausen, Rölscheid, Rüden, Schaberg, Schlicken, Unnersberg, Weeg, Widdert, Wippe
 Merscheid: Büschberg, Dahl, Dingshaus, Fürk, Fürker Irlen, Gönrath, Hübben, Hoffnung, Limminghofen, Scheuren, Schmalzgrube
 Mitte: Entenpfuhl, Eick, Grunenburg, Hasseldelle, Kannenhof, Kohlfurth, Krahenhöhe, Mangenberg, Meigen, Müngsten, Papiermühle, Scheidt, Schlagbaum, Schrodtberg, Stöcken, Stockdum, Theegarten, Vorspel, Windfeln
 Ohligs: Brabant, Broßhaus, Buschfeld, Caspersbroich, Deusberg, Engelsberger Hof, Hackhausen, Keusenhof, Mankhaus, Maubes, Monhofer Feld, Poschheide, Scharrenberg, Schnittert, Suppenheide, Unterland, Wilzhaus, Verlach
 Wald: Bavert, Demmeltrath, Eschbach, Eigen, Fuhr, Garzenhaus, Itter, Kotzert, Lochbachtal, Rolsberg, Vogelsang, Weyer

History

Middle Ages
Solingen was first mentioned in 1067 by a chronicler who called the area "Solonchon". Early variations of the name included "Solengen", "Solungen", and "Soleggen", although the modern name seems to have been in use since the late 14th and early 15th centuries.

Blacksmiths' smelters, dating back over 2000 years, have been found around the town, adding to Solingen's fame as a Northern Europe blacksmith centre. Swords from Solingen have turned up in places such as the Anglo-Saxon kingdoms in the British Isles. Northern Europe prized the quality of Solingen's manufactured weaponry, and they were traded across the European continent. Solingen today remains the knife-centre of Germany.

It was a tiny village for centuries, but became a fortified town in the 15th century.

Thirty Years' War
After being ravaged by the plague with about 1,800 deaths in 1614–1619, Solingen was heavily fought-over during the Thirty Years' War, repeatedly attacked and plundered, and the Burg Castle was destroyed.

Modern Age

Interwar period

In 1929, Ohligs located in the Prussian Rhine Province,  by rail north of Cologne became part of Solingen. Its chief manufactures were cutlery and hardware, and there were iron-foundries and flour mills. Other industries were brewing, dyeing, weaving and brick-making.

World War II
In World War II, the Old Town was completely destroyed by a bombing raid by the RAF in 1944; 1,800 people died and over 1,500 people were injured. As such, there are few pre-war sites in the centre.

Skinhead terrorism
In 1993 Solingen, the birthplace of Adolf Eichmann became once again the scene of racist violence with its 1993 Solingen arson attack, when four skinheads, with neo-Nazi ties, set fire to the house of a large Turkish family. Three girls and two women died; fourteen other family members, including several children, were injured, some of them severely.

Population
Solingen's population doubled between the years 1880 and 1890 due to the incorporation of the town of Dorp into Solingen in 1889, at which time the population reached 36,000. The population again received a large boost on August 1, 1929 through the incorporation of Ohligs, Wald, Höhscheid, and Gräfrath into the city limits. This brought the population above the 100,000 mark, which gave Solingen the distinction of being a "large city" (Großstadt). The number of inhabitants peaked in 1971 with 177,899 residents, and the 2006 population figure was 163,263.

The following chart shows the population figures within Solingen's city limits at the respective points in time. The figures are derived from census estimates or numbers provided by statistical offices or city agencies, with the exception of figures preceding 1843, which were gathered using inconsistent recording techniques.

30.9% of the population of Solingen has foreign roots (statistics 2012).

Politics

Mayor
The current Mayor of Solingen is Tim Kurzbach of the Social Democratic Party (SPD), elected in 2015 and re-elected in 2020. The most recent mayoral election was held on 13 September 2020, and the results were as follows:

! colspan=2| Candidate
! Party
! Votes
! %
|-
| 
| align=left| Tim Kurzbach
| align=left| Social Democratic Party
| 31,836
| 55.4
|-
| 
| align=left| Carsten Heinrich Becker
| align=left| Christian Democratic Union
| 15,776
| 27.4
|-
| 
| align=left| Raoul Torben Brattig
| align=left| Free Democratic Party
| 2,869
| 5.0
|-
| 
| align=left| Andreas Lukisch
| align=left| Alternative for Germany
| 2,499
| 4.3
|-
| 
| align=left| Adrian Scheffels
| align=left| The Left
| 2,172
| 3.8
|-

| 
| align=left| Jan Michael Lange
| align=left| Citizens' Association for Solingen
| 1,624
| 2.8
|-
| 
| align=left| Arnold Falkowski
| align=left| Free Citizens' Union
| 700
| 1.2
|-
! colspan=3| Valid votes
! 57,476
! 99.1
|-
! colspan=3| Invalid votes
! 523
! 0.9
|-
! colspan=3| Total
! 57,999
! 100.0
|-
! colspan=3| Electorate/voter turnout
! 126,301
! 45.9
|-
| colspan=5| Source: State Returning Officer
|}

City council

The Solingen city council governs the city alongside the Mayor. The most recent city council election was held on 13 September 2020, and the results were as follows:

! colspan=2| Party
! Votes
! %
! +/−
! Seats
! +/−
|-
| 
| align=left| Christian Democratic Union (CDU)
| 17,326
| 30.2
|  3.9
| 16
|  1
|-
| 
| align=left| Social Democratic Party (SPD)
| 16,229
| 28.3
|  1.3
| 15
| ±0
|-
| 
| align=left| Alliance 90/The Greens (Grüne)
| 10,428
| 18.2
|  7.0
| 9
|  3
|-
| 
| align=left| Free Democratic Party (FDP)
| 3,178
| 5.5
|  0.6
| 3
| ±0
|-
| 
| align=left| Alternative for Germany (AfD)
| 2,892
| 5.0
|  2.1
| 3
|  1
|-
| 
| align=left| The Left (Die Linke)
| 2,435
| 4.2
|  0.7
| 2
|  1
|-
| 
| align=left| Citizens' Association for Solingen (BfS)
| 1,842
| 3.2
|  1.1
| 2
| ±0
|-
| 
| align=left| Die PARTEI (PARTEI)
| 1,367
| 2.4
| New
| 1
| New
|-
| 
| align=left| Alternative Citizens' Initiative (ABI)
| 635
| 1.1
| New
| 1
| New
|-
| colspan=7 bgcolor=lightgrey| 
|-
| 
| align=left| Free Citizens' Union (FBU)
| 531
| 0.9
| New
| 0
| New
|-
| 
| align=left| Solingen Active (Aktiv)
| 417
| 0.7
| New
| 0
| New
|-
| 
| align=left| Independents
| 34
| 0.1
| –
| 0
| –
|-
! colspan=2| Valid votes
! 57,314
! 98.8
!
!
!
|-
! colspan=2| Invalid votes
! 695
! 1.2
!
!
!
|-
! colspan=2| Total
! 58,009
! 100.0
!
! 52
! ±0
|-
! colspan=2| Electorate/voter turnout
! 126,301
! 45.9
!  2.2
!
!
|-
| colspan=7| Source: State Returning Officer
|}

Transport

Rail
Solingen Hauptbahnhof is served by Rhine-Ruhr S-Bahn line S1 from Düsseldorf and Düsseldorf Airport Station. S-Bahn line S7 links Solingen (including the station nearest the city centre, Solingen Mitte, and Solingen-Grünewald) to Wuppertal via Remscheid, Remscheid-Lennep and Wuppertal-Ronsdorf. This line has been operated by Abellio Deutschland since 15 Dec. 2013. The Rhein-Wupper-Bahn (RB 48) runs over the Gruiten–Köln-Deutz line to Bonn-Mehlem via Opladen and Cologne. It has been operated by National Express as of 13 Dec. 2015.

Trolleybus

Solingen has a trolleybus network, one of only three in Germany remaining besides Eberswalde and Esslingen am Neckar.

Air transport
The nearest airports are Düsseldorf Airport and Cologne Bonn Airport. Both airports can be reached by train from Solingen-Hauptbahnhof (change trains at Köln Messe/Deutz station for the S-Bahn 13 to Cologne Bonn Airport). Other easily reached airports are Frankfurt Airport (ICE train stop), Dortmund Airport (railway station "Holzwickede" on the RE7 trainline) and the low cost Weeze Airport (coaches from Düsseldorf Hauptbahnhof).

Religion

Christianity
Solingen has belonged from its beginnings to the Roman Catholic Archdiocese of Cologne (Erzbistum Köln), and more specifically to the Archdeaconry of the Probst (provost) of St. Kunibert, the deanery of Deutz. Although the Protestant Reformation gradually made gains in the city, which was under the control of the Counts of Berg, the population by and large remained Roman Catholic for a while. The Catholic community was newly endowed by the local lord in 1658 and in 1701 received a new church building. In 1827 Solingen became the seat of its own deanery within the newly defined Archdiocese of Cologne, to which the city's current parishes still belong.

As mentioned, the Reformation only gradually gained a foothold in Solingen. A reformed church affiliated with the Bergisch synod was established in 1590, and the city's parish church became reformed in 1649. Lutherans had been present in Solingen since the beginning of the 17th century, and a Lutheran congregation was founded in 1635. In 1672 a formalized religious agreement was reached between the city's religious groups. The Reformation was also introduced in Gräfrath in 1590, where a church council was apparently established in 1629. The Reformed and Lutheran churches were formed into a united church community in 1838 following the general merger of Reformed and Lutheran churches in Prussia in 1817.

The Protestant parishes originally belonged to the district synod of Lennep, today part of the city Remscheid. A new synod was established in Solingen in 1843, and the city acquired its own superintendent, a form of church administrator. This formed the basis for the present-day Church District of Solingen, a member of the Evangelical Church in the Rhineland. With the exception of the free churches, most Protestant churches belong to the Church District of Solingen.

Today approximately 34% of Solingen's population belongs to Protestant churches, and roughly 26% belong to Catholic churches. Other church communities in Solingen include Greek Orthodox, Evangelical Free (including Baptist and Brethren), Methodist, Seventh-day Adventist, Pentecostal, Salvation Army, and free churches. The Church of Jesus Christ of Latter-day Saints, Jehovah's Witnesses and the New Apostolic Church also have communities in Solingen.

Gallery

Islam
Most of the Turkish immigrants belong to the Muslim faith and they have several mosques/worship places in Solingen:
 DITIB Solingen Wald
 Mesjid Nur
 Islamische Gemeinde Milli Görüs (IGMG)
 Islamisches Kulturzentrum
 Solingen Camii (Verband der Islamischen Kulturzentren, VIKZ)

Main sights

 Burg Castle, the castle of the counts of Berg
 Müngsten Bridge, a railway bridge connecting Solingen with the neighbour town of Remscheid. Standing at 107 m above the ground, it is the highest railway bridge in Germany. It was constructed in 1897 and originally named the Kaiser-Wilhelm-Brücke after Wilhelm I
 Klosterkirche, former convent church (1690)

Museums
 Rhineland Industrial Museum Hendrichs Drop Forge, an Anchor Point of ERIH, The European Route of Industrial Heritage
 German Blade Museum, presenting swords and cutlery of all epochs
 Art Museum Solingen (Museum of Art)
 Museum Plagiarius, the Plagiarius exhibition shows more than 350 product units – i.e., original products and their brazen plagiarisms – in direct comparison. The registered society conducts an annual competition that awards the anti-prize "Plagiarius" to those manufacturers and distributors that a jury of peers have found guilty of making or selling "the most flagrant" imitations.
 Laurel and Hardy Museum
 Zentrum für verfolgte Künste (Center for Persecuted Arts)

Parks and gardens
 Botanischer Garten Solingen, a botanical garden
 Bärenloch
 Walder Stadtpark in Solingen-Wald
 Gustav-Coppel-Park
 Süd-Park
 Brückenpark beneath the Müngsten Bridge

Sports

American football
The Solingen Paladins are an American football club from Solingen in North Rhine-Westphalia, which was founded in 2006. In the 2020 season, the Paladins will play their third season in GFL2 Nord, the second-highest division in Germany.

Baseball
The Solingen Alligators are a baseball and softball club from Solingen. The club was founded in 1991 and the first men's team was promoted to the first division of the Baseball Bundesliga for the 2003 season. It has played there in every season since, winning the league championship in 2006 and 2014. The club claims over 250 members.

Chess
The Schachgesellschaft Solingen e.V. 1868 is best known for its chess team, which plays in the Schachbundesliga (Chess Bundesliga), the top tier of the German chess league system, and is the most successful club in German chess history, having won a record 12 national titles (1969, 1971, 1972, 1973, 1974, 1975, 1980, 1980/81, 1986/87, 1987/88, 1996/97 and 2015/16), three national cups (1986, 2006 und 2009) and 2 European cups (1976 and 1990).

Handball
In handball, Solingen's most successful team is Bergischer HC, playing in the top-tier Handball-Bundesliga which they were promoted to for the second time in 2013, reaching 15th place in the 2013–14 campaign and therefore staying in the top flight for a second consecutive season. BHC originates from a 2006 cooperation between the SG Solingen and rivals LTV Wuppertal from the nearby city of the same name. The club advertises itself as a representative of the entire Bergisches Land region. The team plays its home games at both Solingen's Klingenhalle (2,600 seats) and Wuppertal's Uni-Halle (3,200 seats).

Reception

In May 1955, the city of Solingen took over the partnership of the German general cargo ship Solingen of the Hamburg-American Packet Transit Actien-Gesellschaft (Hapag).

Twin towns – sister cities

Solingen is twinned with:

 Gouda, Netherlands (1957)
 Chalon-sur-Saône, France (1960)
 Cramlington, England, United Kingdom (1962)
 Jinotega, Nicaragua (1985)
 Ness Ziona, Israel (1986)
 Thiès, Senegal (1990)
 Aue, Germany (1990)

Since 1990, Solingen also sponsors Złotoryja County in Poland.

Notable people

Johann Wilhelm Meigen (1764–1845), entomologist
J. C. C. Devaranne (1784–1813), helped to lead resistance against Napoleonic occupation in 1813
Karl Mager (1810–1858), school educator and school politician
Karl Adams (1811–1849), mathematician and teacher
Albert Bierstadt (1830–1902), landscape painter
Adolf Kamphausen (1829–1909), biblical scholar
Carl Klönne (1850–1915), banker
Ernst Otto Beckmann (1853–1923), chemist
Ludwig Woltmann (1871–1907), anthropologist, zoologist and neo-Kantian
Artur Möller van den Bruck (1876–1925), writer
Albert Müller (1891–1954), communist and politician
Paul Voss (1894–1976), designer
Paul Franken (1894–1944), socialist politician, victim of Stalinism
Karl Allmenröder (1896–1917), fighter pilot
Hanns Heinen (1895–1961), writer, journalist and publicist
Carl Clauberg (1898–1957), Nazi gynecologist and war criminal
Erwin Bowien (1899–1972), painter and writer
Hermann Friedrich Graebe (1900–1986), manager and engineer, 'Righteous Among the Nations' by Israel
Josef Dahmen (1903–1985), actor
Adolf Eichmann (1906–1962), SS-Obersturmbannführer and major organiser of the Holocaust
Georg Meistermann (1911–1990), painter of sacred and secular glass windows
Jürgen Thorwald (1915–2006), writer, journalist and historian
Christel Rupke (1919–1998), swimmer
Walter Scheel (1919–2016), politician (FDP), the 4th President of Germany (1974–1979)
Bettina Heinen-Ayech (1937–2020), painter an publicist
Klaus Lehnertz (born 1938), athlete
Adolf Weil (1938–2011), motocross rider
Christoph Wolff (born 1940), musicologist
Pina Bausch (1940–2009), dancer and choreographer
Ulay (1943–2020), artist
Wolfgang Schwerk (born 1955), Ultramarathon runner
Timotheus Höttges (born 1962), CEO of Deutsche Telekom
Richard David Precht (born 1964), philosopher, writer and publicist
Veronica Ferres (born 1965), actress
Sebastian Thrun (born 1967), entrepreneur, educator and computer scientist
Jens Weidmann (born 1968), President of Deutsche Bundesbank
Mola Adebisi (born 1973), TV-presenter
Marco Matias (born 1975), German-Portuguese singer
Fahriye Evcen (born 1986), actress
Kevin Kampl (born 1990), Slovenian footballer
Christoph Kramer (born 1991), footballer

The founders of Studebaker Brothers Manufacturing Company, which later became the automobile company Studebaker, trace their lineage to bladesmen from the region that migrated to America in 1736.

References

External links
 
Travel guide from die-bergischen-drei.de 

 
Cities in North Rhine-Westphalia
Members of the Hanseatic League